Manimala Devi (19 June 1931 – 16 June 2016) was an Indian Odia film actress.
Devi was born in the Bilibasi village of Cuttack, and stepped into the film world at the age of nine. She never went to school. In 1945 she started to act in the Annapurna theatre of Cuttack.

The films in which Devi acted, including her first film, Shri Lokanath,  received national awards.
Audiences especially enjoyed the performances she shared with Samuel Sahoo.

Dramas
 Chandaluni
 Janaki
 Chasha Jhia
 Kala Pahada
 Mukti Konark
 Shree Jayadev

Films
 Andha Diganta, 1990
 Kichi Smruti Kichi Anubhuti, 1989
 Nishiddha Swapna, 1988
 Klanta Aparanha, 1985
 Maya Miriga, 1984
 Niraba Jhada, 1984
 Kie Kahara, 1967
 Bhai Bhauja, 1967
 Kaa, 1966
 Malajanha, 1965
 Abhinetri, 1965
 Jibanasathi, 1963
 Laxmi, 1962
 Shree Lokanath], 1960

Awards
 Kabisamrat Upendra Bhanja Award : 2008 
 Jayadev Award: 2000 
 Guru Kelucharana Mohapatra Award: 1999
 Odisha Sangeeta Nataka Academy Award : 1987 (Lifelong achievement Award))‌

References

More Data
 

1931 births
2016 deaths
People from Odisha